İlxıçılar or Ilxıçılar or Ilkhychylar or Yikhchilar may refer to:
İlxıçılar, Tartar, Azerbaijan
İlxıçılar, Agdam, Azerbaijan